Sir Laurier d'Arthabaska is a soft cheese from Centre-du-Québec region, in Canada. It is named after the first French Canadian to become Prime Minister of the country: Sir Wilfrid Laurier.

More information
Type: soft paste, very fruity
Manufacturer: Fromagerie Côté
Fat content: 25%
Humidity content: 55%

See also
 List of cheeses

External links
Official Website

Sir Laurier d'Arthabaska
Sir Laurier d'Arthabaska